Mario Enrique Rizotto Vázquez (born August 30, 1984 in Canelones, Uruguay) is an Uruguayan footballer currently playing for C.D. Técnico Universitario of the Serie A in Ecuador.

Teams
  Fénix 2006-2008
  River Plate (Montevideo) 2008-2012
  Independiente del Valle 2013–2017
  S.D. Aucas 2018
  C.S.D. Macará 2019–2020
               Técnico Universitario 2021–present

Honours

Copa Libertadores Runner Up (1): 2016

References
 Profile at BDFA 
 

1984 births
Living people
People from Canelones Department
Uruguayan people of Italian descent
Uruguayan footballers
Uruguayan expatriate footballers
Club Atlético River Plate (Montevideo) players
Centro Atlético Fénix players
C.S.D. Independiente del Valle footballers
Expatriate footballers in Ecuador

Association football midfielders